The 2019–20 Penn State Nittany Lions men's ice hockey season was the 14th season of play for the program and the 7th season in the Big Ten Conference. The Nittany Lions represented Pennsylvania State University and were coached by Guy Gadowsky, in his 9th season.

On March 12, 2020, the Big Ten announced that the tournament was cancelled due to the coronavirus pandemic.

Departures

Recruiting

Roster

As of September 3, 2019.

Standings

Schedule and Results

|-
!colspan=12 style=";" | Exhibition

|-
!colspan=12 style=";" | Regular Season

|-
!colspan=12 style=";" | 
|- align="center" bgcolor="#e0e0e0"
|colspan=12|Tournament Cancelled

Scoring Statistics

Goaltending statistics

Rankings

Players drafted into the NHL

2020 NHL Entry Draft

† incoming freshman

References

External links

Penn State Nittany Lions men's ice hockey seasons
Penn State Nittany Lions 
Penn State Nittany Lions 
2019 in sports in Pennsylvania
2020 in sports in Pennsylvania